is a tiny near-Earth asteroid discovered by the Mount Lemmon Survey on 18 September 2020, six days before it made its closest approach to Earth. The encounter with Earth perturbed the asteroid's heliocentric trajectory from an Apollo-type orbit to an Aten-type orbit with a semi-major axis within one astronomical unit from the Sun. As a result, the asteroid will not make any close approaches to Earth within  in the next 200 years.

Had it impacted Earth, it would mostly have disintegrated as a fireball during atmospheric entry and might have left a common strewn field. Extensive observations of its brightness during the close encounter show that it is an elongated body with a rapid rotation period of 28.5 seconds.

Discovery 
 was discovered on 18 September 2020 by the Mount Lemmon Survey under astronomer Kacper W. Wierzchoś, stationed at the Mount Lemmon Observatory in Tucson, Arizona. The asteroid was first observed in the constellation Pegasus at an apparent magnitude of 21.4.

The asteroid was subsequently listed on the Minor Planet Center's Near-Earth Object Confirmation Page (NEOCP) as C378AD2. Follow-up observations were carried out by four other observatories including Pan-STARRS 1  and the Catalina Sky Survey .

Orbit and classification 
 is currently on an Earth-crossing Aten-type orbit with an orbital semi-major axis of 0.941 AU and an orbital period of 0.91 years. With a nominal perihelion distance of 0.743 AU and an aphelion distance of 1.140 AU, 's orbit extends from Venus to Earth, resulting in occasional close passes with these planets.

Before the Earth encounter on 18 September 2020,  had a more distant Apollo-type orbit crossing the path of Earth. It had a perihelion distance of 0.822 AU and a semi-major axis of 1.015 AU, with an orbital period of 1.02 years. The orbit had an orbital eccentricity of 0.190 and an inclination of 4.2 degrees to the ecliptic.

Physical characteristics

Albedo and diameter 
Based on an magnitude-to-diameter conversion and a measured absolute magnitude of 29.06,  measures between 4 and 9 metres in diameter for an assumed geometric albedo of 0.25 and 0.05, respectively. Given its small size,  can be compared to a small school bus. It is too small to pose any threat to Earth and its nominal orbit is not known to be on an impact trajectory with the planet. Even had it impacted Earth, it would mostly have disintegrated as a fireball during atmospheric entry and might have left a common strewn field.

Shape and rotation 
The  close encounter with Earth provided an opportunity for astronomers to take detailed measurements of its light curve to determine the asteroid's rough shape and rotation period. On 24 September 2020, within 10 hours before closest approach to Earth,  was continually observed by astronomer Peter Birtwhistle at the Great Shefford Observatory  for 2 hours and 51 minutes.

See also 
 List of asteroid close approaches to Earth in 2020
 List of fast rotators (minor planets)

References

External links 
 "Pseudo-MPEC" for C378AD2 , Project Pluto, 19 September 2020
 
 
 

Discoveries by MLS

Minor planet object articles (unnumbered)
20200918
20200918